Veniano is a comune (municipality) in the Province of Como in the Italian region Lombardy, located about  northwest of Milan and about  southwest of Como.

Veniano borders the following municipalities: Appiano Gentile, Fenegrò, Guanzate, Lurago Marinone.

Population history

References

External links
 www.comune.veniano.co.it/

Cities and towns in Lombardy